The 2018–19 Scottish League One (known as the Ladbrokes League One for sponsorship reasons) was the 24th season in the current format of 10 teams in the third-tier of Scottish football. The fixtures were published on 15 June 2018 and the season began on 4 August 2018.

Ten teams contested the league: Airdrieonians, Arbroath, Brechin City, Dumbarton, East Fife, Forfar Athletic, Montrose, Raith Rovers, Stenhousemuir and Stranraer.

Arbroath won the league following a 1–1 draw at Brechin City on 13 April 2019. Brechin were relegated after a 1–1 draw with Stenhousemuir on the final day.

Teams
The following teams have changed division since the 2017–18 season.

To League One
Promoted from League Two
 Montrose
 Stenhousemuir

Relegated from the Championship
 Brechin City
 Dumbarton

From League One
Relegated to League Two
 Albion Rovers
 Queen's Park

Promoted to the Championship
 Ayr United
 Alloa Athletic

Stadia and locations

Personnel and kits

Managerial changes

League summary

League table

Positions by round
The table lists the positions of teams after each week of matches. In order to preserve chronological progress, any postponed matches are not included in the round at which they were originally scheduled but added to the full round they were played immediately afterwards. For example, if a match is scheduled for matchday 13, but then postponed and played between days 16 and 17, it will be added to the standings for day 16.

 

Source: BBC Sport
Updated: 4 May 2019

Results
Teams play each other four times, twice in the first half of the season (home and away) and twice in the second half of the season (home and away), making a total of 36 games.

First half of season

Second half of season

Season statistics

Scoring

Top scorers

Hat-tricks 

Note

(H) = Home, (A) = Away

Attendances

Awards

League One play-offs
The second bottom team (Stenhousemuir) entered into a four-team playoff with the second, third, and fourth placed teams in League Two (Clyde, Edinburgh City and Annan Athletic). Clyde were promoted to League One after defeating Annan 2–0 in the final. Stenhousemuir were relegated to League Two after defeat to Annan in the semi-final.

Semi-final

First leg

Second leg

Final

First leg

Second leg

References

External links
Official website 

Scottish League One seasons
3
3
Scotland